The Neonai is the fifth studio album by the gothic metal band Lake of Tears. It was released in 2002, being finished off by Daniel Brennare alone, with little help from the other band members. The album was hastily completed to honor the band's contract with Black Mark Production. Practically, the band had been on a temporary hiatus since 2000 and Brennare focused on the songs he thought would be most easily produced and mastered. As a result, unlike earlier work by Lake of Tears, the album features a drum machine, a minimal guitar approach, and heavy use of keyboards and electronic equipment. Ironically, it featured some of the band's more memorable tunes, although they differ from the "classic" Lake of Tears sound and feel. A remixed version of the song "Sorcerers" was released as a single, with "Nathalie and the Fireflies" as a B-side.

Track listing 
All songs written by Daniel Brennare and arranged by Ulf Wahlberg and Lake of Tears.

Personnel
 Daniel Brennare - vocals, guitar
 Mikael Larsson - bass
 Johan Oudhuis - drums

Additional personnel 

Jennie Tebler - additional vocals
Ulf Wahlberg - keyboards, producer, engineering
Magnus Sahlgren - guitars
Necrolord - cover art
Claes Persson - mastering
Stig Börje Forsberg - producer

External links
 Encyclopaedia Metallum bands by letter - L - Lake of Tears - The Neonai (retrieved 8-18-07)

2002 albums
Lake of Tears albums